Parentheses in mathematical equations may refer to:

 Precedence of operators
 Interval
 Matrix
 Arguments in mathematical functions. For example, f(x) is the function f applied to the variable x. 
 A set of coordinates in a coordinate system. For example (4,7) may represent the point located at 4 on the x-axis and 7 on the y-axis.
 More generally, a tuple.
 The greatest common divisor of two numbers x and y, sometimes written with the notation (x,y).
 An inner product 
 A higher order derivative in Lagrange's notation.
 A Binomial coefficient or multinomial coefficient.
 A Legendre symbol, Jacobi symbol or Pochhammer symbol.